Pommerhelix monacha is a species of air-breathing land snail, a terrestrial pulmonate gastropod mollusc in the family Camaenidae. 

This species is found in eastern Australia.

Distribution 
This snail is found in high altitude rainforests in Blue Mountains, central eastern New South Wales, Australia.

The type locality is "Australia", which can be specified to Sassafras Gully, Springwood, New South Wales, Australia.

Description 
The shell of Pommerhelix monacha is subglobose (almost round). The shell has 5.6–6.0 whorls. The color of the shell is dark brown to black, but it can also be dark red or purple in colour. The shell sculpture consists of zigzag ridges combined with small ridges on the periostracum. The umbilicus is closed. The aperture is roundly ovate in shape.

The width of the shell is 26.2-30.3 mm. The height of the shell is 18.1-23.2 mm.

The visible soft parts are a yellowish grey in colour: the body is grey to dark grey and the mantle is dark yellow or orange.

References

 Mclauchlan, C. F. (1954). Three new land shells from New South Wales. Australian Zoologist. 12: 39.
 Clark, S.A. (2009). A review of the land snail genus Meridolum (Gastropoda: Camaenidae) from central New South Wales, Australia. Molluscan Research. 29(2): 61–120.

External links
  Pfeiffer, L. (1859). Descriptions of twenty-seven new species of land-shells, from the collection of H. Cuming, Esq. Proceedings of the Zoological Society of London. 27 (385): 23–29, pls 43–44. London
 Crosse H. (1864). Diagnoses de mollusques terrestres nouveaux. Journal de Conchyliologie. 12(3): 282-286

Gastropods of Australia
Camaenidae
Gastropods described in 1859